Grant Gunnell (born November 24, 1999) is an American football quarterback for the North Texas Mean Green. Gunnell began his career with Arizona in 2019 before transferring to Memphis in 2021 and then to North Texas in 2022.

Early years
Originally playing at College Park High School in The Woodlands, Texas as a freshman, Gunnell transferred to St. Pius X High School in Houston, Texas as a sophomore. During his career at St Pius, he set the Texas high school records for passing touchdowns (195) and passing yards (16,108).  Grant was a USA Today All American, second team his senior year.  He was a MaxPreps Junior All American, MaxPreps Sophomore All American, MaxPreps Sophomore Co-Player of the Year, and was a MaxPreps Freshman All American. Additionally, Grant played in the US Army All American Bowl and was a finalist for Player of the Year. Within the state of Texas, he was a first-team all-state selection as a Sophomore, Junior, and Senior. 

A three-star recruit, Gunnell was Texas's top QB prospect and received 42 college scholarship offers, including from powerhouses like Alabama, Florida, Georgia, Notre Dame, Ohio State, and Oklahoma, to name a few. Of all those scholarship offers, Gunnell originally committed early on to Arkansas but recommitted to Texas A&M, where his brother was playing wide receiver, but recommitted again later into his senior year to the University of Arizona, to play college football under Kevin Sumlin.

College career

Arizona
Gunnell entered his freshman season at Arizona in 2019 as a backup to Khalil Tate. He made his first career start in a game against UCLA, throwing for 352 yards and a touchdown. Overall he played in eight games with three starts and completed 101 of 155 passes for 1,239 yards, nine touchdowns and one interception. However, Gunnell was also the starting quarterback during Arizona's 2020 winless season, which included their historic loss to in-state rival Arizona State 70-7. Following the game, Arizona head coach Kevin Sumlin was fired, and Gunnell announced on social media that he would be transferring from Arizona to Memphis.

Memphis
After transferring to Memphis for the 2021 season, Gunnell saw no playing time after receiving surgery on his right leg. Following the season, Gunnell reportedly played "incredibly well" in the spring scrimmage, but ultimately transferred to North Texas.

North Texas
Gunnell transferred to North Texas to begin play for the North Texas Mean Green in 2022.

References

External links
Memphis Tigers bio

Living people
People from The Woodlands, Texas
Players of American football from Texas
American football quarterbacks
Arizona Wildcats football players
Memphis Tigers football players
North Texas Mean Green football players
Sportspeople from the Houston metropolitan area
1999 births